Hamiso Tabuai-Fidow (born 5 September 2001), also known by the nickname of "Hammer", is a Samoa international rugby league footballer who plays as a  and er for the Dolphins in the NRL.

He previously played for the North Queensland Cowboys in the National Rugby League. He has played at representative level for Queensland in the State of Origin series.

Background
Born and raised in Cairns, Queensland to an Indigenous Australian Torres Strait Islander mother and a Samoan father, Tabuai-Fidow played his junior rugby league for the Cairns Kangaroos. He also played junior Australian rules football at a high level in his teenage years and was placed in the Gold Coast Suns' development academy before giving the sport away to accept a scholarship to play rugby union for Brisbane Grammar School. While living in Brisbane, he was a member of the Queensland Reds development squad before being signed by the North Queensland Cowboys in 2017. He completed his schooling in Townsville where he attended Kirwan State High School.

Playing career

Early career
In 2018, Tabuai-Fidow played for the Northern Pride's Mal Meninga Cup team, scoring five tries in seven games. In 2019, he moved to Townsville, joining the North Queensland under-20 squad, and played for the Townsville Blackhawks Mal Meninga Cup team, where he scored 13 tries in six games. Following the Mal Meninga Cup competition, he started at fullback for the Queensland under-18 team in their win over New South Wales. 

He then moved up to the Blackhawks' Hastings Deering Colts side, where he scored eight tries in five games. In June 2019, he re-signed with the North Queensland side until the end of the 2022 season. On 29 September 2019, he started at centre for the Australian Schoolboys, scoring two tries in their win over the Junior Kiwis.

2020
In 2020, Tabuai-Fidow joined the North Queensland Cowboys NRL squad and was a member of their 2020 NRL Nines winning side, finishing the tournament as the equal leading try scorer.

In Round 5 of the 2020 NRL season, Tabuai-Fidow made his NRL debut against the New Zealand Warriors, setting up two tries in a 26–37 loss. In Round 7, he scored his first NRL try in a 32–20 win over the Newcastle Knights. In his rookie season, Tabuai-Fidow played 14 games and scored six tries. On 3 October, he was named the North Queensland club's Rookie of the Year.

2021
Tabuai-Fidow was selected by Queensland for game 3 of the 2021 State of Origin series which Queensland won 20-18.

On 21 July, it was announced that Tabuai-Fidow would be out for six weeks after undergoing an emergency appendectomy.

2022
In round 13 of the 2022 NRL season, he scored two tries for North Queensland in a 32-6 victory over the Gold Coast.

Tabuai-Fidow played 23 games for North Queensland throughout the year and scored seven tries.  He played in both of the clubs finals games including their shock preliminary final loss against Parramatta at the Queensland Country Bank Stadium.  On 5 October, he signed a two-year deal to join the newly admitted Dolphins side starting in 2023.

In October Tabuai-Fidow was named in the Samoa squad for the 2021 Rugby League World Cup.

2023
In round 1 of the 2023 NRL season, Tabuai-Fidow scored the first try in the Dolphins' NRL history.
The following week, he scored two tries as the Dolphins defeated Canberra 20-14.

Achievements and accolades

Individual
North Queensland Cowboys Rookie of the Year: 2020

Team
AFL Cairns: Cairns Hawks U/16 Grand Final
2020 NRL Nines: North Queensland Cowboys – Winners

Statistics

NRL
 Statistics are correct to the end of the 2022 season

References

External links

North Queensland Cowboys profile
Samoa profile

2001 births
Living people
Australian rugby league players
Indigenous Australian rugby league players
Australian people of Nauruan descent
Australian sportspeople of Samoan descent
Australian people of Tokelauan descent
North Queensland Cowboys players
Dolphins (NRL) players
Queensland Rugby League State of Origin players
Rugby league fullbacks
Rugby league wingers
Rugby league players from Cairns
Torres Strait Islanders